Yod is the astrological formation of two astral bodies (luminaries, planets, asteroids, et cetera) or calculated points (such as midheaven) sextile (60°, 1/6 the zodiac compass) to each other and a third quincunx / inconjunct (150°, 5/12 the zodiac compass) to them both.

[Because the third placement is around opposite the midpoint of the other two, connecting their placements on a single wheel with lines creates an isosceles triangle.  However, it is inaccurate to assert that all isosceles triangles in astrological charts are yods.  For example, the midpoint semi-sextile (30° separated) to both the sextile (60° separated) points would also form an isosceles triangle with it, but would be semi-sextile to the other two instead of quincunx/inconjunct to them.]

Astrological chart
A Yod is a name for an aspect which forms a triangle shape. The two sextile (60° apart) planets are harmonious to each other yet lack intensity, where as the quincunx (150° apart) planet is incompatible to either of the sextile planets, as it shares neither polarity (Yin/assertive or yang/receptive), element (fire, water, air, or earth), or modality (cardinal, fixed, or mutable). The Yod aspect is often referred to as a nondescript "calling", a need to find release or an answer in the placement of the third, apex planet.

Meaning

Astrology explains that raised or multi-aspected planets within the Yod can produce unusual situations and personalities, and should therefore be carefully examined. One possible approach is for an individual to view the yod as an exchange of positive forces around a mediating middle (though oppositional) planet. The quincunxed planet will act as a conduit of energy, or as a profound and deeply felt block. This aspect can produce a heightened direction of energy in the chart which may also oscillate between bifurcated states or situated personalities. A planetary opposition to the quincunxed planet of the Yod can be malefic, or can produce situations of dramatic reversal.

The midpoint of the sextile is a very sensitive point in the chart, as transiting planets, when conjunct with this midpoint, will then be in opposition to the quincunxed planet.  This situation is said to trigger major events, thus revealing the true power of the Yod.   Multiple sextiles and trines involving Yod planets can be extremely beneficial and thus spread the energy of this aspect in one side of the chart or produce a focal point for intense energies on the other side of the chart. Hence, the yod is the most difficult natal chart aspect to interpret and requires a great aptitude in astrological interpretation to divine accurately.

Hypothetical example
A hypothetical example of a Yod would be with Jupiter at 11° Pisces in a quincunx angle to Mars at 11° Leo and the Sun at 11° Libra. The conflict arises between the worldly, sociable character of Leo and Libra, which tend to seek inspiration in the world, versus the introverted, unworldly character of Pisces, which is too sensitive to be able to cope with worldly life and aims to work in the background serving others. These energies do not interact and hence this hypothetical native would possess great difficulty making the choice between serving others and seeking inspiration on the social stage.

Jupiter is in a feminine sign, while the Sun and Mars are both in masculine signs.  Jupiter is also in a mutable water sign, while the Sun is in a cardinal air sign and Mars in a fixed fire sign.  Jupiter shares neither duality, element, nor mode with the two planets that aspect it in quincunx.  This complete lack of commonality of Jupiter with the two sextile planets illustrates how the yod triggers an irritating situation that can be overcome only through adaptation and discovering new paths.  If there is no other aspect outlet for Jupiter (as would be reflected in a trine or sextile angle to another planet), a transiting planet in opposition to Jupiter and conjunct the midpoint of the sextile planets can trigger major life events which are difficult to handle and take great creativity to overcome.  This is why the yod is often called the "Finger of God", for it takes great initiative and fortitude to overcome the limitations created by the yod, but great rewards can result if the native does the necessary work.

Golden yod

Related to the yod, though much less inharmonious and more rarely noticed, is the golden yod. A golden Yod occurs when one planet forms biquintiles (144° aspect) to two others separated by a quintile(72° aspect). Because these aspects are seen as beneficial, the golden yod is seen as beneficial and often as reflecting characteristics acquired by the person whose chart contains it. The few astrologers who have studied it regard it as an extremely creatively charged aspect good for artistic skill, especially as quintiles and biquintiles are frequently linked with Neptune. An alternate perspective is that a yod is always an aspect that indicates some kind of dramatic event, or 'fate'; Yods of every type represent extraordinary powers available for good or ill; it is largely a matter of how the individual uses the energy, and whether the planets forming the crucial aspects are in any way harmonious.  
 
An example of a golden Yod would be with the Sun at 20° Cancer, Uranus at 8° Taurus and Jupiter at 14° Sagittarius.

References

Further reading
 
 

Astrological aspects